The 2016 season is Rosenborg's 26th consecutive year in Tippeligaen, their 49th season in the top flight of Norwegian football and second season with Kåre Ingebrigtsen as permanent manager. They will participate in Tippeligaen, the Cup and the 2016–17 UEFA Champions League, entering at the Second qualifying round stage.

Squad

Transfers

Winter

In:

Out:

Summer

In:

 

 

Out:

Competitions

Tippeligaen

Results summary

Results by round

Results

Table

Norwegian Cup

Final

Champions League

Qualifying phase

UEFA Europa League

Qualifying rounds

Club Friendlies

Squad statistics

Appearances and goals

  

 

|-
|colspan="14"|Players away from Rosenborg on loan:

|-
|colspan="14"|Players who appeared for Rosenborg no longer at the club:

|}

Disciplinary record

See also
Rosenborg BK seasons

Notes
Viking versus Rosenborg was postponed due to Rosenborg participating in European competition.

References 

2016
Rosenborg
Norwegian football championship-winning seasons